Desert Pirate is Thomas Leeb's fourth available release and features 10 instrumentals.

Track listing

 "Grooveyard"
 "Jebuda"
 "Nai Nai"
 "Oachkatzlschwoaf"
 "Isobel"
 "No Woman, No Cry"
 "Desert Pirate"
 "Ladzekpo"
 "Oft Geht Bled"
 "Quicksilver"

All songs by Thomas Leeb, except 
 "Isobel" (Björk, arr. Leeb)
 "No Woman, No Cry" (Vincent Ford, arr. Leeb)

Personnel

Thomas Leeb - acoustic guitar
Eric Spitzer - mixing & mastering

References

2007 albums
Thomas Leeb albums